In the second yukam called Chathura Yukam, according to Ayyavazhi mythology one of the six Pieces of Kroni was formed as a creature with the name of Kuntomasali with the shape and size of a  mammoth leech, and when it disturbed the tavam of those in Thavalokam, Lord Narayana destroyed it by catching it in a hook.

See also
Ayyavazhi mythology
List of Ayyavazhi-related articles

Ayyavazhi mythology
Eight Yugas